Tavistock is a town in Devon, England. It may also refer to:

People
Marquess of Tavistock, the title given to the eldest sons of the Dukes of Bedford

Places
Tavistock, Devon, England
Tavistock (UK Parliament constituency), a former constituency
Tavistock railway station, a proposed new station
Tavistock North railway station, a former PD&SWJR station
Tavistock South railway station, a former LSWR station
Tavistock, Ontario, Canada
Tavistock, Delaware, United States
Tavistock, New Jersey, United States
Tavistock Centre, a building in North London that houses the Tavistock and Portman NHS Foundation Trust
Tavistock Square, London, England
Tavistock MRT station, a future station in Singapore

Organizations

Tavistock and Portman NHS Foundation Trust, a mental health provider and research institute within the National Health Service in the UK
Tavistock Clinic, a mental health therapy centre in the UK
Tavistock College, a school in Tavistock, Devon
Tavistock Institute, a charity concerned with group behaviour and organisational behaviour
Tavistock Group, a large investment firm
Tavistock Relationships, an operating unit of the Tavistock Institute of Medical Psychology, a charity involved in relationship counselling
Tavistock A.F.C., a football club of Devon, England

See also 
 Bell v Tavistock, a 2020 High Court of Justice of England and Wales decision on puberty blockers
 Tawstock, a village in north Devon